Felipe Clemente de Diego y Gutiérrez (1866 – 1945) was a Spanish jurist who was instrumental in rebuilding the Spanish state and its judiciary after the Francoist victory in the Spanish Civil War.

Clemente de Diego taught Roman law in Santiago in 1897–99 and civil law in Valladolid, Barcelona and Madrid until 1936. He co-founded the Revista de derecho privado, later the most significant civil law journal in Spain, in 1913. In 1938, the Franquist regime named him president of the Tribunal Supremo (Supreme Court), which post he held until his death.

The principal work of Clemente de Diego is the six-volume Curso elemental de Derecho civil español común y foral (1920–23). He also engaged in the study of the philosophy of law, promoting the adherence to an ideal of natural law founded on Christian ethics in the practice of law, and denouncing legal formalism as the reason for the perceived crisis of the legal system prior to the civil war.

References
 

Spanish jurists
1866 births
1945 deaths